ST6 (alpha-N-acetyl-neuraminyl-2,3-beta-galactosyl-1,3)-N-acetylgalactosaminide alpha-2,6-sialyltransferase 4, also known as sialyltransferase 3C (SIAT3-C) or sialyltransferase 7D (SIAT7-D) is a sialyltransferase enzyme that in humans is encoded by the ST6GALNAC4  gene.

Function 

ST6GALNAC4 is a type II membrane protein that catalyzes the transfer of sialic acid from CMP-sialic acid to galactose-containing substrates. The encoded protein prefers glycoproteins rather than glycolipids as substrates and shows restricted substrate specificity, utilizing only the trisaccharide sequence Neu5Ac-alpha-2,3-Gal-beta-1,3-GalNAc. In addition, it is involved in the synthesis of ganglioside GD1A from GM1B. The enzyme is normally found in the Golgi apparatus but can be proteolytically processed to a soluble form. This protein is a member of glycosyltransferase family 29. Transcript variants encoding different isoforms have been found for this gene.

References

Further reading